Qaracallı (also, Karadzhally, Karadzhanly, and Karajali) is a village in the Jabrayil Rayon of Azerbaijan.

References 

Populated places in Jabrayil District